Abu Mansur Mamari was an Iranian nobleman who served as the personal minister of the Samanid general Abu Mansur Muhammad. At an unknown date, the latter wanted to create a Shahnameh ("Book of Kings"), and ordered Abu Mansur Mamari to invite several scholars. They created a New Persian version of the Khwaday-Namag in 957, and expanded it with other sources. The book became known as "Shahnama-yi Abu Mansuri" (the book of kings of Abu Mansuri). However, only the introduction of the book remains today, which claims that Abu Mansur Mamari was descended from Kanadbak, who served as the kanarang of the Sasanian king Khosrau II. Not much more is known about Abu Mansur Mamari; he later died in the 10th-century.

Sources 
 
 

10th-century Iranian politicians
10th-century deaths
Samanid officials
Year of birth unknown
10th-century births